Samuel the Confessor (referred to in academic literature as Samuel of Kalamoun or Samuel of Qalamun) is a Coptic Orthodox saint, venerated in all Oriental Orthodox Churches. He is most famous for his torture at the hands of the Chalcedonian Byzantines, for his witness of the Arab invasion of Egypt, and for having built the monastery that carries his name in Mount Qalamoun. He carries the label "confessor" because he endured torture for his Christian faith, but was not a martyr.

The manuscripts of the Coptic text known as the Apocalypse of Samuel of Kalamoun give his name as the author.

Early life 

Samuel was born in 597 AD in the city of Daklube, Egypt, to a non-Chalcedonian priest called Arselaos. He spent most of his early years as a disciple of Agathon.

While at the Monastery of Saint Macarius, a Byzantine imperial envoy attempted to convince the desert monks to confess the Chalcedonian faith. Samuel became zealous and seized the imperial letter and rent it into pieces saying "Excommunicated is this tome and everyone who believes in it, and cursed is everyone who might change the Orthodox faith of our Holy Fathers." Seized with anger, the envoy ordered Samuel to be beaten with pins and to be hanged up by his arms, and that his face be smitten. One of the strikes enucleated one of his eyes.

When Cyrus of Alexandria came to the city of Faiyum, he had Samuel brought to him in chains like a thief. Samuel went rejoicing in the Lord and saying, 'Please God, it will be given me this day to shed my blood for the name of Christ.' When Cyrus saw him, he ordered the soldiers to beat him until his blood ran like water. Then he said to him, 'Samuel, you wicked ascetic, who is he that made you abbot of the monastery, and bade you teach the monks to curse me and my faith?' Holy Abba Samuel answered, 'It is good to obey God and His holy Archbishop Benjamin rather than obey you and your devilish doctrine, O son of Satan, Antichrist, Beguiler.' Cyrus bade the soldiers to smite him on the mouth, saying, 'Your spirit is kindled, Samuel, because the monks glorify you as an ascetic: but I will teach you what it is to speak evil of dignities, since you render me not the honour which is my due as Archbishop and my due as Controller of the Revenues of the land of Egypt.' Samuel replied, 'Satan also was controller, having angels under him: but his pride and unbelief estranged him from the glory of God. So with you also, O Chalcedonian Deceiver, your faith is defiled and you are more accursed than the devil and his angels.' On hearing this, the Cyrus was filled with fury against the saint, and signed to the soldiers to strike him dead, but the ruler of Faiyum delivered him from their hands. When Cyrus saw that Samuel had escaped, he ordered him driven away from the Nitrian Desert.

After leaving Scetes, Samuel dwelt in Mount Qalamoun, currently in the Upper Egyptian governorate of Minya. At Mount Qalamoun, Samuel founded a monastery that carries his name and still exists to this day.

Samuel also suffered at the hands of sun-worshiping Berbers who took him captive for some time. In his captivity, he met and befriended Youannis the Archpriest of Scetes, who was also captured by the Berbers. When the Berbers failed to convince Samuel to worship the sun, they tied his leg with an iron chain to that of a maiden, and sent them to attend the camels, hoping that the maiden would seduce Samuel and win him as a sun-worshipper. Yet, Samuel did not deny his faith and remained strong in his Christian faith. Eventually, after healing his master's son who was on the verge of death, he was released and permitted to return to Mount Qalamoun. After his return, he prophesied about and witnessed the Arab invasion of Egypt in 641 AD.

Samuel the Confessor died on 8 Koiak 412 AM (17 December 695 AD).

See also
Monastery of Saint Samuel the Confessor
Council of Chalcedon
Coptic monasticism

References

External links
Samuel the Confessor in Coptic Orthodox Synaxarium
St. Samuel the Confessor from the Official Website of St. Samuel Coptic Orthodox Monastery, El Kalamon Mountain
St. Mary and St. Samuel the Confessor Coptic Orthodox Church

Egyptian hermits
Egyptian Christian monks
7th-century Christian saints
Coptic history
597 births
695 deaths
Coptic Orthodox saints
7th-century Byzantine monks
Egyptian people of Coptic descent